The Bois du Parc National Nature Reserve (RNN39) is a National Nature Reserve located in the department of Yonne. Established in 1979, it spreads over 45 ha, and its most interesting features are its steep-sided cliffs in an important coral reef dating from the Jurassic era.

Location 

The site is located in Burgundy, along the Yonne, between Auxerre and Avallon and in the territory of the commune of Mailly-le-Château.

History of the site and reserve 

160 million of years ago, what is now the Yonne valley was a warm and shallow sea, enabling the development of a coral reef characteristic of tropical seas.
Fossilized prints of corallite, petrified in its living location, still remains, along with numerous seashells. It is one of the most beautiful outcrops of fossilized corals in France.

Ecology (biodiversity, ecological interest, etc.) 

Specific natural environments have colonized the site. The top of the cliffs and rocks is occupied by dry grasslands characterized by the presence of bushlands and southern plants. Those constitutes the most interesting biological diversity of the site. Broadleaf forests, made of sessile oaks, hornbeams and field maples, covers the brown earth of the limestone plateau. In the South-West, downy oaks have colonized the rocky slopes, while beech forests and lindens thrives in the North-facing slope.

Flora

Sub-mediterranean species are found on the site, isolated with respect to their common repartition in Southern Burgundy.  European feather grass, pasqueflowers, St Bernard's lilies and Cantabrican morning glories can be found in the area.

Fauna

Local fauna is closely linked with the diversity of natural habitats : cliffs, grasslands, forest.

Birds

The avifauna is rich, with, in forested areas, the European honey buzzard and the Eurasian sparrowhawk, in their outskirts, the Eurasian blackcap and the western Bonelli's warbler, while the cliffs hosts the black redstart and the common kestrel. The emblematic peregrine falcon nidifies too in the reserve.

Reptiles and amphibians

The driest areas hosts several reptiles, such as the green whip snake, the Aesculapian snake and the western green lizard.

Invertebrates

The entomologic fauna is quite rich in the grasslands. The most characteristic elements are the European mantis, the New Forest cicada, and the owly sulphur.

Touristic and educational interest 

A discovery trail permits to visit freely the nature reserve across the forests and the grasslands in top of the cliffs.

Administration, management plan, regulations

The nature reserve is managed by the Conservatoire des sites naturels bourguignons.

Tools and legal status

The nature reserve was established the 30 August 1979.

References

External links 

 

Protected areas established in 1979
Regional natural parks of France
Geography of Yonne
Tourist attractions in Yonne
Geologic formations of France
Jurassic Europe
Limestone formations
Fossiliferous stratigraphic units of Europe
Paleontology in France
Yonne